Walter Raleigh ( – 1618) was an English writer, poet, soldier, courtier and explorer.

Walter Raleigh may also refer to:
Walter Raleigh (professor) (1861–1922), English scholar, poet and author
Walter Raleigh (priest) (1586–1646), Dean of Wells, 1642–1644
"Sir Walter Raleigh" (essay), an essay by Henry David Thoreau
Sir Walter Raleigh (play), a 1719 tragedy by George Sewell
Sir Walter Raleigh Hotel, a hotel in Raleigh, North Carolina
Sir Walter Raleigh, a GWR 3031 Class locomotive that was built for and run on the Great Western Railway between 1891 and 1915

See also
Sir Walter (born 1890), American race horse 

Raleigh, Walter